Taïg Khris is an entrepreneur and former professional vert skater.

Biography
In 2010, Taïg dropped from the first floor of the Eiffel Tower, onto a massive vert ramp below, and breaks the world record for the highest inline skate jump.

References

Further reading

External links
 
 
 

Aggressive inline skaters
French roller skaters
Living people
Vert skaters
Year of birth missing (living people)